Samuel Sipepa Nkomo is a former Zimbabwe Minister of Water Resources Development and Management. He was nominated for appointment to the Senate of Zimbabwe as a non-constituency senator. 

He is also the Water Resources Minister.

References

External links
 

Members of the Senate of Zimbabwe
Living people
Government ministers of Zimbabwe
1940s births
Zimbabwean Seventh-day Adventists